Raceland-Worthington Independent School District is a school district headquartered in Raceland, Kentucky; it serves Raceland and Worthington.

Its schools:
 Campbell Elementary School (Raceland) (K-3)
 Raceland-Worthington Middle School (Raceland) (4-7)
 Raceland-Worthington High School (Raceland) (9-12)

References

External links
 Raceland-Worthington Independent School District
School districts in Kentucky
Education in Greenup County, Kentucky